The original Škoda Superb is a full size luxury car that was made by the Czechoslovak car manufacturer ASAP, later AZNP from 1934 to 1949. It was the company's first car with a V8 engine and all-wheel drive.

In 2001 Škoda revived the Superb model name for an unrelated model based on the Volkswagen Passat.

Background
ASAP introduced a new range of cars in 1930s that significantly differed from its previous products. A new design of chassis with backbone tube and all-round independent suspension was developed under the leadership of chief engineer Vladimír Matouš and derived from the one introduced by Hans Ledwinka at Tatra. First used on the 420 Standard in 1933, it aimed to solve the problem of insufficient torsional stiffness that was inherent with a ladder frame.

The backbone chassis was the basis for the Popular, Rapid, Favorit and Superb models. While in 1933 Škoda had a 14% share of the Czechoslovak car market, behind both Praga and Tatra, the company's new models helped it to become a market leader by 1936, with a 39% share in 1938.

The Superb was introduced in 1934, at the time being Škoda's second highest model range after the 650 (which was discontinued the same year) and it cost about double the price of a Rapid. The Superb was a replacement for the 860, a luxury 4-door limousine with a straight-eight engine that had been built between 1929 and 1932.

Design
The central supporting tube was split at the front, which allowed the engine and gearbox to be attached. The drive shaft was located inside the tube, and transmitted the engine's power to the rear wheels. The Superb utilized leaf springs for its suspension; one at the front and two at the rear. It featured hydraulically-operated drum brakes, with a mechanical handbrake connected to the rear wheels.

First and second generation (Type 640)

It had a dry clutch and a four-speed manual gearbox with synchromesh on the 3rd and 4th gear. The car was offered with either 4 or 6 seats. Two different versions of this type were made.

Third generation (Type 902)
A new generation of Superb was introduced in May 1936 as the Type 902.

When Škoda introduced the Superb in 1934, one of its main Czechoslovak competitors, Tatra, had begun to manufacture the Type 77, with a V8 engine; this was the world's first serially produced aerodynamic car. In order to compete with this car, the Type 902 Superb had more rounded bodywork and featured frontal styling more reminiscent of the smaller Popular and Rapid models.

The Type 902 was available as 4 seat or 6 seat saloon, and as a 2-door cabriolet. Sodomka also produced a special version of the saloon that had a longer and more aerodynamic body.

Fourth generation (Type 913)
Another change came in October 1936, when the Superb Type 913 was introduced.

The Type 913 was most commonly available in four basic versions: a 6- or 7-seat limousine, 5-seat saloon, and a 5-seat, 2-door saloon. Other less common versions included a luxury 2-door cabriolet, ambulance, panel van, and a pick-up truck. Production ended in February 1939. Some of the last cars to be produced used the bigger  engine from the Type 924 prototype, which featured overhead valves for the first time, in place of the flathead arrangement used in the earlier engines.

Fifth generation

Type 924
The first prototype of the Type 924 was built in 1937; however, it did not enter production until 1939. The Type 924 had a new  overhead-valve straight-six engine, an extended wheelbase and shorter, more rounded bodywork. The 924 was characterized by having its spare-wheels located behind the front mudguards.

The most common version of the Type 924 was the 6-seat limousine. Its middle row of seats could be folded, allowing the passengers in the rear to have more space.

After the war, production of the Type 924 Superb continued in small numbers throughout 1947–48, with 60 saloons and 100 open-top cars made, some of them in a luxurious version intended for parades. Officially, they were all delivered to the Czechoslovak Ministry of Interior.

Types 952 and 956

In 1941–43, Škoda produced a military version of the Type 924 model for the Wehrmacht and its Nazi Allies. The production took place in then-Nazi-occupied Bohemia and began with a rear-wheel drive version called the Type 952 and culminated, briefly, with the all-wheel drive Type 956.

There were three military versions available: Kfz 21, a luxury command cabriolet used by high officers in the field such as General Heinz Guderian and Field Marshal Erwin Rommel (100 made), Kfz 15, a personnel-carrier and a raid car (1,600 were produced) and a military ambulance, of which 30 were produced.

Superb 4000 (Type 919)
Unlike the previous straight-six models, the V8 had three gears, with second and third gears having synchromesh fitted. Only twelve cars of this type were made.

Several historical Škoda Superb cars can be seen at the Škoda Auto Museum in Mladá Boleslav.

Specifications

References

1930s cars
1940s cars
All-wheel-drive vehicles
Cars introduced in 1934
Compact executive cars
Convertibles
Limousines
Rear-wheel-drive vehicles
Sedans
Superb (1934-1949)